MFN may refer to:

 MFN, acronym for Most favoured nation status in international relations
 MfN, acronym for Museum für Naturkunde, a natural history museum in Berlin, Germany
 MFN, the IATA code for Milford Sound Airport, New Zealand
 Metromedia Fiber Network, Inc., now known as AboveNet
 Multi-frequency network
 Music for Nations, a British record label
 "MFN", a song by Cibo Matto from their 2014 album Hotel Valentine

de:MFN